Shiki Station is the name of two train stations in Japan:

 Shiki Station (Osaka) (志紀駅)
 Shiki Station (Saitama) (志木駅)